Piotr Kurbiel (born 7 February 1996) is a Polish professional footballer who plays as a striker for Stomil Olsztyn.

Club career
On 6 January 2020, he signed a 1,5-year contract with GKS Katowice.

Career statistics

Club

1 Including Polish SuperCup.

References

External links
 

1996 births
People from Radom
Sportspeople from Masovian Voivodeship
Living people
Polish footballers
Association football forwards
Lech Poznań II players
Lech Poznań players
MKP Pogoń Siedlce players
Olimpia Elbląg players
Błękitni Stargard players
GKS Katowice players
OKS Stomil Olsztyn players
Ekstraklasa players
I liga players
II liga players
III liga players